William Stanley Pickering (21 June 1879 – 9 August 1939) was an Australian rules footballer who played with St Kilda in the Victorian Football League (VFL).

References

External links 

1879 births
1939 deaths
Australian rules footballers from Victoria (Australia)
St Kilda Football Club players